Pre-Hysterical Hare is a 1958 Warner Bros. Looney Tunes cartoon directed by Robert McKimson and written by Tedd Pierce. The short was released on November 1, 1958, and stars Bugs Bunny and Elmer Fudd. The two are in their usual hunter-and-bunny antics, but set in the Stone Age.

This cartoon marks one of the few instances where Elmer Fudd is voiced by somebody other than Mel Blanc or Arthur Q. Bryan, being voiced by Dave Barry.

Plot
The opening scene depicts Bugs and Elmer in the modern day, with Elmer's gun blasting at Bugs repeatedly. Bugs finally pauses long enough to tell the audience: "Someday, they'll outlaw this annual madness known as Rabbit Season." He hops over a stone dike, but either the ground on the other side is not firm enough to support him, or he lands with too much force.

Bugs assumes that he has fallen into a cave possibly belonging to giant Native Americans. This assumption comes from a giant powder horn on the wall with odd writing on it (the writing briefly changes to English: reading "TIME CAPSULE — CIRCA 10,000 BC TO BE OPENED 1960 AD," then reverts to its original format as Bugs approaches it). Much to his surprise, when he opens it, a reel of film pops out. This he transports (off-camera) back to his hole and views through his own film projector.

During the opening, a variety of clashes take place amidst the palm trees and other tropical surroundings, i.e. dinosaurs fighting each other (an inaccuracy) including a Brontosaurus chased by a Tyrannosaurus rex, a Mammoth and a Parasaurolophus, a sabre-toothed tiger and a Pteranodon and a Stegosaurus and an Allosaurus battling, before we are introduced to Elmer Fuddstone (A Caveman version of Elmer Fudd), who emerges from his cave and announces that he is hunting a sabre-toothed rabbit (A prehistoric version of Bugs).

A sabre-toothed rabbit hole now appears on the screen — albeit covered by a rock. Its inhabitant pushes it aside and emerges, looking very much like Bugs, albeit with less-well-groomed fur and longer teeth.

Elmer Fuddstone now appears, spear in hand, and huddles low to the ground. He continues on, up into a tree, where he rips a vine off one branch and ties a loop in one end like a lasso. The looped end he allows to fall to the ground, but when the prehistoric Bugs passes by, he pulls on the string and Elmer falls down.

Next, the prehistoric Elmer grabs a hollow stick, into one end of which he places a poisonous berry, but as he prepares to blow it at Bugs, he suffers the effects of the projectile's consumption as the rabbit blows it in his mouth first. Bugs asks him: "What's up, Doc?" whereupon Elmer blasts the "tweachewous wabbit" for not allowing him to hunt him and thus provide his killer's family with clothes and food. Bugs feigns guilt and, under the pretext of wanting to help, mentions that somebody is going to invent gunpowder one day, closely followed by guns.

This entices Fuddstone to begin developing gunpowder almost at once, and shortly thereafter he demonstrates this to Bugs. He rubs a wooden stick in a small skin bag of gunpowder, which explodes. Elmer is now high in an old tree, ashen-faced and much the worse for wear, but he maintains a triumphant look upon his face.

Bugs searches for items out of which to manufacture a gun, in the end settling on the hollow stick that previously contained the toxic berry Elmer swallowed by mistake for a gunbarrel, and "a taro root for a stock." Elmer grows impatient, but Bugs soon attaches the root to one end of the stick, pours in powder and pebbles, packs it down tight and hands the finished product to his pursuer. He lights the fuse with an extremely primitive version of a cigarette lighter, but right before he fires, Bugs removes the stock and plugs it into the other end of the barrel, causing Elmer to shoot himself in the face.

The film ends, and Elmer Fudd finally takes the initiative to climb down into Bugs' hole. However, Fudd does not notice that he is holding his gun so that it points at him; so repeating his ancestor's mistake, he shoots himself. Bugs says, "That's what I think.", and he laughs as the cartoon ends.

Background music
This is one of six cartoons (and the only Bugs Bunny cartoon) scored by using stock music by John Seely of Capitol Records from the Hi-Q library because of a musicians' strike in 1958. The others are Hook, Line and Stinker, Weasel While You Work, Hip Hip-Hurry!, Gopher Broke, and A Bird in a Bonnet.

References

External links

 

1958 films
1958 animated films
1958 short films
Animated films set in prehistory
Animated films about dinosaurs
Films directed by Robert McKimson
Films set in 1960
Looney Tunes shorts
Warner Bros. Cartoons animated short films
Bugs Bunny films
Elmer Fudd films
1950s Warner Bros. animated short films
1950s English-language films